The following lists events that happened during 2015 in Djibouti.

Incumbents
President: Ismaïl Omar Guelleh
Prime Minister: Abdoulkader Kamil Mohamed

Events

January 23, 2015

 Turkish President Recep Tayyip Erdoğan will visit Djibouti as part of his African visit.

References

 
2010s in Djibouti
Years of the 21st century in Djibouti
Djibouti
Djibouti